Kocaköy is a town and district of Diyarbakır Province of Turkey. The population is 5,764 (as of 2010)

Politics 
In the local elections in March 2019 Rojda Nazlıer was elected mayor. In October 2019 she was dismissed and charged with being a member of a terrorist organization. The current District Governor is Yasin Yunak, who was also appointed as trustee after Nazlıer was dismissed.

History 
During the conflict between the Turkish Government and the Workers' Party of Kurdistan (PKK), a part of the districts rural population was resettled urban areas.  

In 2017 curfews were declared by the Turkish government aimed to support the fight against the PKK.

References

Kurdish settlements in Turkey
Populated places in Diyarbakır Province
Districts of Diyarbakır Province